The South Atlantic–Gulf water resource region is one of 21 major geographic areas, or regions, in the first level of classification used by the United States Geological Survey to divide and sub-divide the United States into successively smaller hydrologic units. These geographic areas contain either the drainage area of a major river, or the combined drainage areas of a series of rivers.

This region includes the drainage that ultimately discharges into: (a) the Atlantic Ocean within and between the states of Virginia and Florida; (b) the Gulf of Mexico within and between the states of Florida and Louisiana; and (c) the associated waters. The geographic area of the South Atlantic–Gulf region includes all of Florida and South Carolina, and parts of Alabama, Georgia, Louisiana, Mississippi, North Carolina, Tennessee, and Virginia.

Listing of water resource subregions

See also
List of rivers in the United States
Water Resource Region

References

Lists of drainage basins
Drainage basins
Watersheds of the United States
Regions of the United States
 Resource
Water resource regions